PEGASUS is an encryption algorithm used for satellite telemetry, command link and mission data transfers.

According to budget item justification document for FY 2004–2005, this cryptographic algorithm is used for Global Positioning Systems (GPS), Space-Based Infrared Systems (SBIRS), MILSATCOM, and other Special Project Systems.

References

External links
 PEGASUS products

Spaceflight technology
Telecommunications
Cryptographic algorithms